The Engilchek is a river in Ak-Suu District of Issyk-Kul Region of eastern Kyrgyzstan. It drains the Engilchek Glacier in the Central Tian Shan Mountains. It is a left tributary of the river Saryjaz (Aksu in China). The only populated place on its banks is the mining village Engilchek, near its confluence with the Saryjaz.

References

Rivers of Kyrgyzstan
Issyk-Kul Region